Utricularia christopheri is a small perennial carnivorous plant that belongs to the genus Utricularia. It is endemic to the Himalaya region and includes distributions in Sikkim, India and Nepal. It was originally described by Peter Taylor in 1986.

See also 
 List of Utricularia species

References 

christopheri
Flora of East Himalaya
Flora of Nepal
Carnivorous plants of Asia
Plants described in 1986